Dominic Perri is a politician in Montreal, Quebec, Canada. He has served on the Montreal city council since January 1, 2002, and was a member of the Saint-Leonard city council and chair of the Commission scolaire Jérôme-Le Royer.

Private career
Perri holds a Bachelor of Science degree and a master's degree. He is a high-school science teacher in private life.

Saint Leonard city councillor
Perri was elected for Saint Leonard's sixth council district in the 1982 municipal election as a candidate of mayor Antonio di Ciocco's Équipe du renouveau de la cité de Saint-Léonard. The party fragmented after Di Ciocco's death in 1984, and Perri joined the Ralliement de Saint-Léonard under successor mayor Raymond Renaud. He considered running for mayor of Saint Leonard in 1986, saying that he had been approached by local politicians such as Michel Bissonnet. When Renaud announced that he would seek another term, however, Perri decided against challenging him and was instead re-elected to council.

In 1988, Perri joined with Frank Zampino and six other Saint Leonard councillors in resigning from Renaud's party. Charging that Renaud's administration was undemocratic, the rebels established new municipal committees to oversee policy and increase civic participation in government. The group coalesced as the Parti municipal, and Perri was re-elected under its banner in 1990, 1994, and 1998.

School board commissioner
Perri was elected to the Commission scolaire Jérôme-Le Royer in 1980 and re-elected in 1983. He became chair of the board in 1984, succeeding Alfonso Gagliano, who had been elected to the House of Commons of Canada.

Language issues
Perri welcomed the creation of an English-language educational services department in early 1985, saying that it would permit the board's anglophone students to access a full range of services. A single department had previously overseen both French and English services. Later in the year, Perri announced that his board would start providing recreational and crafts services in English.

Perri supported measures to increase bilingualism among his board's students. He promoted a voluntary pilot project for francophone students to receive English-language instruction as early as the first grade. He also oversaw an expansion in French-language education for anglophone students, saying, "I'd like our kids coming out of English school completely bilingual."

Perri opposed efforts to replace Quebec's denominational school system with a language-based system, arguing that the shift would be detrimental to English schools.

Other issues
In 1985, Perri supported a plan to shift 450 French-sector seventh grade students to a local comprehensive school in order to create space for an equal number of younger students. Some parents opposed this plan, arguing that the comprehensive school was too large and that the seventh graders would be exposed to the bad habits of older students. As a compromise, the board proposed constructing a wall that would divide the comprehensive school into two units; it was refused permission to do this by the province's education department. The student transfer ultimately did not take place.

After 1987
When running for re-election in 1987, Perri called for an increased focus on English, French, maths, and sciences, and a reduction in the number of elective courses. His political partnership with fellow commissioner Joe Morselli dissolved during the election, and, although Perri was himself re-elected, only one other member of his governing alliance was returned to the board. The new board chose Morselli to succeed Perri as chair and discontinued Perri's pilot project of teaching English to first-grade francophone students.

Perri was re-elected to the board in 1990 and 1994.

Montreal city councillor
Saint-Leonard was amalgamated into the City of Montreal in 2001. Perri was elected to the Montreal city council in that year's municipal election as a candidate of Gérald Tremblay's Montreal Island Citizens' Union and was re-elected in 2005 and 2009. He has served on the board of the Montreal Transit Corporation and has chaired its subsidiary, Transgesco LP, since its creation.

By virtue of serving on the Montreal city council, Perri also serves on the Saint-Leonard borough council. He chaired the borough's planning advisory committee from 2002 until 2010. In 2005, he introduced a motion for Saint-Leonard to ban pit bull dogs. He also initiated a ban on wood burning in Montreal which led to a municipal bylaw forbidding wood burning in new constructions.

On July 3, 2012, at the Saint-Leonard borough meeting, Perri said that he was not convinced that Saint-Leonard was getting its fair budget share from the City of Montreal as it was promised before the merger with Montreal. He added that he was going to  bring it up with the president of the Executive Committee.

Following the departure of Gerald Tremblay as mayor of Montreal, Perri did not support Michael Applebaum as interim mayor principally because he saw him as a centralizer, someone who does not best represent the interests of Saint Leonard borough. On May 8, 2013, Perri resigned from Union Montreal to sit as an independent Montreal city councillor. He continues promoting the extension of the metro blue line towards Saint Leonard. In addition, Perri urges new mayor and favors bilingual status for Montreal. He joined Équipe Denis Coderre in August 2013.

Federal politics
Perri campaigned with Liberal Party candidate Nicola Di Iorio in 2015 federal election.

He did the same with Conservative candidate Ilario Maiolo in 2019 despite his colleague Patricia Lattanzio running for the Liberal Party.

Electoral record

City council

School commission

References

External links
Union Montreal biography

Living people
Canadian people of Italian descent
Montreal city councillors
People from Saint-Leonard, Quebec
Quebec school board members
21st-century Canadian politicians
Year of birth missing (living people)